Gerhard Weilheim, better known as Gerry Weil (born 11 August 1939 in Vienna), is an Austrian-born Venezuelan jazz musician.  In 2009, Weil received the Decoration of Merit in Gold for Services to the Republic of Austria from the Austrian government.

Discography 

 1969: El Quinteto De Jazz
 1971: The Message
 "The Joy Within' Yourself" (Gerry Weil)
 "The Bull's Problem" (Gerry Weil)
 "The Message" (Gerry Weil)
 "Johnny's Bag" (Gerry Weil)
 "What Is A Man" (Gerry Weil)
 "Little Man" (Gerry Weil)
 1984: Jazz En Caracas
 1989: Autana/Magic Mountain
 1993: Volao
 1999: Profundo
 2005: Free Play & Love Songs
 2006: Empatía
 2006: Navijazz
 2009: Tepuy
 2020: Kosmic Flow (80 Years Young)

References

External links
Gerry Weil Discography

1939 births
Living people
Austrian expatriates in Venezuela
Austrian emigrants to Venezuela 
Venezuelan music educators
Venezuelan musicians
Venezuelan jazz pianists

Recipients of the Decoration of Merit for Services to the Republic of Austria
21st-century pianists